The  New York Giants season was the franchise's 46th season in the National Football League. This was the first season for the Giants after the AFL–NFL merger, in which ten American Football League teams joined the National Football League. The team was led by second-year head coach Alex Webster. The Giants finished the season 9–5 for their first winning season in 7 years (1963), but they missed the playoffs by losing their season finale against the Los Angeles Rams by a score of 31–3. The Giants finished second in the NFC East, a game behind the Dallas Cowboys. They were also only one game out of a wild-card playoff spot, won by the Detroit Lions.

Probably more damaging to the Giants' playoff hopes than the loss to the Rams were two devastating losses to two of the NFL's worst teams: 

 The first was a 14–10 loss at New Orleans in week three. The Giants were the victims of a blown call by head linesman Bruce Finlayson, who ruled tight end Aaron Thomas to be out of bounds on what would have been a game-winning touchdown pass from Fran Tarkenton in the closing minutes. Replays showed Thomas had both feet down in bounds with control of the ball. The Saints' only other win of 1970 came five weeks later when Tom Dempsey kicked a then-NFL record 63-yard field goal for a 19-17 decision over the Detroit Lions, ironically the team that beat out the Giants for the final playoff spot in the NFC.

 The second was a 23–20 setback at Philadelphia on Monday Night Football in week 10, the Giants' only setback in a 10-week stretch following the loss to the Saints. The game at Franklin Field was more memorable for the antics in the broadcast booth, where Howard Cosell vomited on Don Meredith's cowboy boots. Cosell took a taxi back to the hotel at halftime, leaving Meredith to finish the game with Keith Jackson. 

The Saints finished with the NFL's second-worst record at 2–11–1 (the Giants beat the NFL's worst team of 1970, the 2–12 Boston Patriots); the Eagles were barely better at 3–10–1. The Giants also lost at home to the 6-8 Chicago Bears. 

This was the closest the Giants came to qualifying for the playoffs in the 1970s. The franchise enjoyed only one other winning season in the decade, going 8–6 in 1972. Big Blue did not return to the playoffs until 1981, ending a drought which dated back to the 1963 NFL Championship.

Offense
The 1970 Giants offense was led by Pro Bowl performers, quarterback Fran Tarkenton, and running back Ron Johnson. The team was in the top ten in several offensive categories including points, yards, and first downs. The team had over one hundred rushing yards in eleven of its fourteen games, including 202 yards in a week eight win against the Dallas Cowboys. The offense struggled when the team failed to run the ball well, as in the week fourteen loss to the Los Angeles Rams in which the Giants rushed for only 50 yards. When the team was able to run the ball and play defense they were able to win. In all their wins, they had at least 100 yards rushing. The leading passer was Fran Tarkenton, the leading rusher was Ron Johnson (the first Giant to rush for 1,000 yards in a season; 1,027), and the leading receiver was Clifton McNeil.

Defense
The best defensive game by far for the Giants was the shutout of the Boston Patriots (2–12) in a week 5 victory. In that game, the Giants allowed only 155 total offensive yards against one of the weakest teams in the league. The team leader in interceptions for the Giants was Willie Williams, who had 6 interceptions for 114 total interception yards.

The backbone of New York's defense was a stout front four featuring ends Fred Dryer and Jim Kanicki and tackle Bob Lurtsema. Williams was part of a solid secondary which also included Tom Longo, Scott Eaton and Spider Lockhart. First round draft pick Jim Files moved in at the starting middle linebacker spot for the departed Henry Davis, who moved on to Pittsburgh.

Special teams
The kicker for the Giants that season was Pete Gogolak. Gogolak was a perfect 32 of 32 in extra points but hit only 25 of 41 field goals attempted on the year, with his longest being a kick of 54 yards in week eight vs. the Cowboys, a kick which came on the same day Tom Dempsey set an NFL record with a 63-yard field goal for the Saints vs. the Lions, and 43-year-old George Blanda hit a 53-yard field goal at the gun to lift Oakland over Cleveland 23–20.

Bill Johnson and Ernie Koy shared punting duties for the Giants, and each was average for the position. Bobby Duhon and Les Shy were the main kick and punt returners, though neither returned a kick for a touchdown.

Draft

Roster

Schedule
{| class="wikitable" style="text-align:center"
|-
!style=""| Week
!style=""| Date
!style=""| Opponent
!style=""| Result
!style=""| Record
!style=""| Venue
!style=""| Attendance
|-style="background:#fcc"
! 1
| 
| Chicago Bears
| L 16–24
| 0–1
| Yankee Stadium
| 62,936
|-style="background:#fcc"
! 2
| September 27
| at Dallas Cowboys
| L 10–28
| 0–2
| Cotton Bowl
| 57,236
|-style="background:#fcc"
! 3
| October 4
| at New Orleans Saints
| L 10–14
| 0–3
| Tulane Stadium
| 69,126
|-style="background:#cfc"
! 4
| October 11
| Philadelphia Eagles| W 30–23
| 1–3
| Yankee Stadium
| 62,820
|-style="background:#cfc"
! 5
| October 18
| at Boston Patriots
| W 16–0
| 2–3
| Harvard Stadium
| 39,091
|-style="background:#cfc"
! 6
| October 25
| St. Louis Cardinals| W 35–17
| 3–3
| Yankee Stadium
| 62,984
|-style="background:#cfc"
! 7
| November 1
| at New York Jets
| W 22–10
| 4–3
| Shea Stadium
| 63,903
|-style="background:#cfc"
! 8
| November 8
| Dallas Cowboys| W 23–20
| 5–3
| Yankee Stadium
| 62,938
|-style="background:#cfc"
! 9
| November 15
| Washington Redskins| W 35–33
| 6–3
| Yankee Stadium
| 62,915
|-style="background:#fcc"
! 10
| 
| at Philadelphia Eagles| L 20–23
| 6–4
| Franklin Field
| 59,117
|-style="background:#cfc"
! 11
| November 29
| at Washington Redskins| W 27–24
| 7–4
| Robert F. Kennedy Memorial Stadium
| 50,415
|-style="background:#cfc"
! 12
| December 6
| Buffalo Bills
| W 20–6
| 8–4
| Yankee Stadium
| 62,870
|-style="background:#cfc"
! 13
| December 13
| at St. Louis Cardinals| W 34–17
| 9–4
| Busch Memorial Stadium
| 50,845
|-style="background:#fcc"
! 14
| December 20
| Los Angeles Rams
| L 3–31
| 9–5
| Yankee Stadium
| 62,870
|}Note: Intra-division opponents are in bold''' text.

Standings

Season summary

Week 1 vs Bears

See also
List of New York Giants seasons

References

New York Giants
New York Giants seasons
New York Giants
1970s in the Bronx